Kathrin or Katrin or Kathryn or Kathrine is a female given name.

Persons with the name
 Ann-Kathrin Kramer (born 1966), German writer and actress
 Ann-Kathrin Linsenhoff (born 1960), German athlete in equestrian
 Kathryn Adams (1893–1959), United States actress in silent movies
 Kathrin Beck (born 1966), Austrian athlete in figure skating
 Kathrin Becker (fl. 2000s), head of the Video-Forum at the Neuer Berliner Kunstverein (NBK) in Berlin since 2001
 Kathrin Born-Boyde (born 1970), German athlete in walk racing
 Kathrin Boron (born 1969), German athlete in rowing
 Kathrin Bringmann (born 1977), German professor (Mathematics)
 Kathrin Brown, any of several women with the name or variants
 Kathrin Dienstbier (fl. 1980s), German athlete in rowing
 Katrin Dörre-Heinig (born 1961), German athlete in long-distance running
 Kathrin Entner (born 1988), Austrian athlete in football
 Kathrin Freudelsperger (born 1987), Austrian athlete in figure skating
 Kathrin Giese, East German sprint canoeist who competed in the early to mid-1980s
 Kathrin Haacker (born 1967), German athlete in rowing
 Kathrin Hölzl (born 1984), German alpine ski racer, the gold medalist in the giant slalom at the 2009 World Championships
 Kathrin Klaas (born 1984), German track/field athlete (hammer throw)
 Kathrin Krahfuss (born 1985), Austrian representative in Miss World 2008
 Kathrin Johnson, any of several women with the name or variants thereof
 Kathrin Lang ((née Hitzer; born 1986), German biathlete
 Kathrin Längert (born 1987), German athlete in football
 Kathrine Maaseide (born 1976), Norwegian athlete in 2004 Olympics (beach volleyball)
 Kathrin Menzinger (born 1988), Austrian dancer
 Kathrin Michel (born 1963), German politician
 Kathrin M. Moeslein (born 1966), German professor (Business Administration)
Kathrin Muegge, German physician and molecular biologist 
 Kathrine Narducci (born 1965), United States actress in film and television
 Kathrin Neimke (born 1966), German track and field athlete
 Kathrin Passig (born 1970), German writer
 Kathrin Piotrowski (born 1980), German badminton player
 Kathrin Ress (born 1985), Italian professional basketball player in the WNBA
 Kathrin Stoll (fl. 1980s), East German sprint canoeist who competed in the early 1980s
 Kathrin Weiss (fl. 1970–80s), Swiss athlete in slalom canoeing
 Kathrin Weßel (née Ullrich; born 1967), retired German long-distance runner who specialized in the 10,000 metres
 Kathrin Wörle-Scheller (born 1984), professional German tennis player
 Kathrin Zettel (born 1986), Austrian alpine skier from Göstling, in Scheibbs
 Kathrin Zimmermann (born 1966), East German athlete in swimming

See also
 Bonjour Kathrin – Caterina Valente präsentiert ihre größten Erfolge, an album from Caterina Valente

da:Kathrin
no:Kathrin